McConkey is a 2013 documentary film about extreme skier Shane McConkey. The film follows Shane from growing up as the son of skier Jim McConkey to his days as a professional freeskier. The film also focuses on Shane's 2009 death during a ski base jump and his continued influence over the sport of skiing. The film features interviews from notable athletes and friends of Shane such as JT Holmes, Tony Hawk and Travis Pastrana.

References

External links
 
 ShaneMcConkey.org

2013 films
American sports documentary films
Documentary films about sportspeople
2013 documentary films
American skiing films
2010s English-language films
2010s American films